This is a list of Angolan writers, ordered alphabetically by surname.

 Henrique Abranches (1932–2004), poet
 Antero Abreu (1927–2017), poet
 José Eduardo Agualusa (born 1960), Portuguese journalist and fiction writer
 Fernando Costa Andrade (1936–2009), poet
 Mário Pinto de Andrade (1928–1990), poet and politician
 Mario António (1934–1989), poet
 Gabriela Antunes (1937–2004), folklore 
 Arlindo Barbeitos (born 1940), poet
 Geraldo Bessa Victor (1917–1985), poet
 Dulce Braga (born 1958), autobiographer
 António Cardoso (1933–2006), short story writer
 Mendes de Carvalho, writing as Uanhenga Xitu, politician and Africanist writer in Portuguese and Kimbundu
Lisa Castel (born 1955), writer and journalist
 Alberto Graves Chakussanga (1978–2010), murdered Angolan radio journalist
 Maria João Chipalavela
 Tomaz Vieira da Cruz (1900–1960), poet
 Viriato da Cruz (1928–1973), poet
 Alexandre Dáskalos (born 1924), poet
 Maria Alexandre Dáskalos (born 1957) 
 Raul David (1918–2005?)
 Kalaf Epalanga (born 1978)
 Lopito Feijóo (born 1963), poet
Isabel Ferreira (born 1958)
 Ernesto Lara Filho (1932–1977), poet
 Domingos Florentino (born 1953)
 Henrique Guerra (born 1937), short story writer
 Duque Kate Hama (born 1963)
 António Jacinto (1924–1991), poet and political activist 
 Sousa Jamba (born 1966), Anglophone journalist and novelist
 Kandjila (born 1973)
 Luis Kandjimbo (born 1960), essayist and critic
 Dia Kassembe (born 1946), Francophone writer and novelist
 Alda Lara (1930–1962), poet
 Manuel de Santos Lima (born 1935) 
 Amélia da Lomba (born 1961), writer and journalist
 Reis Luís, or "Mbwanga" (born 1968), Portuguese-language novelist
 João Maimona (born 1955), poet and essayist
 Rafael Marques (born 1971), journalist
 André Massaki (1923–1996), politician and writer
 Joaqim Dias Cordeiro da Matta (1857–1894), folklorist
 Cikakata Mbalundu (Aníbal Simões) (born 1955)
 Manuel Rui Monteiro (born 1941), poet
 Agostinho Neto (1922–1979), poet  
 Frederico Ningi (born 1959), poet, journalist
 Ondjaki (born 1977), poet, novelist and dramatist
 Ernesto Cochat Osório (1917–2002), doctor and poet
 Pepetela, pen-name of Artur Carlos Maurício Pestana dos Santos (born 1941), writer of fiction
 José de Fontes Pereira (1838–1891), early Angolan journalist
Wanda Ramos (1948–1998) 
 Inácio Rebelo de Andrade (born 1935)
 Oscar Ribas (1909–2004), novelist
 Alcides Sakala Simões (born 1953)
 Ana de Santana (born 1960)
 Aires de Almeida Santos
 Arnaldo Santos (born 1936), poet
 Maria Perpétua Candeias da Silva, teacher and short story writer
 Paula Tavares (born 1952), poet
 Timóteo Ulika (Cornélio Caley)
 José Luandino Vieira (born 1935), short-story writer and novelist 
 Uanhenga Xitu (1924–2014), writer and nationalist
 Mota Yekenha (born 1962)

See also 
 List of African writers by country
 List of Portuguese-language poets

References

Angola
Angolan
Writers
 List